The Groninger ziekte (also called ‘intermittent fevers’) that broke out in 1826 was a malaria epidemic that killed 2,844 people—nearly 10% of the population of the city of Groningen.

In February 1825 the dikes broke in several places causing widespread flooding in the region. The decay of plants and cattle under swamp-like conditions and the flooding of the city of Groningen in 1826 in the subsequent hot spring and summer of 1826 led to the epidemic. Sibrandus Stratingh was among those infected and was bedridden for two months, and recommended the use of chlorine (which was recently discovered by that time) to aid with reducing the epidemic. Groningen became the first known city to use chlorine for this purpose. 

The epidemic also hit Friesland and the German Wadden Sea region. The Frisian town of Sneek reported a tripling of the number of deaths in 1826 as compared to previous years.

References

 
 
 
 

1826 disease outbreaks
1826 disasters in the Netherlands
19th-century epidemics
History of Groningen (city)
Malaria
1826 in the Netherlands
Disease outbreaks in the Netherlands
Events in Groningen (city)